Arild Hiim (born 17 August 1945 in Ringerike) is a Norwegian politician for the Conservative Party.

He was elected to the Norwegian Parliament from Buskerud in 1989, and was re-elected on one occasion. He had previously served in the position of deputy representative during the term 1985–1989.

Hiim was a member of Ringerike city council from 1971 to 1979. He then became mayor of Buskerud county, serving in 1979–1983. His successor Åse Klundelien was elected to the Parliament in 1989 as well.

References

1945 births
Living people
Conservative Party (Norway) politicians
Members of the Storting
20th-century Norwegian politicians
People from Ringerike (municipality)